Beryslav is a city in Kherson Oblast of southern Ukraine. It serves as the administrative center for Beryslav Raion (district), housing the district's local administration buildings. Beryslav hosts the administration of Beryslav urban hromada, one of the hromadas of Ukraine. It had a population of 

The city is located on the right-bank of Dnieper river across from Kakhovka on the opposite bank. Until the creation of the Kakhovka Reservoir, the city contained one of a historical crossing over the Dnieper.

History
One of the oldest settlements in the Kherson Oblast, in the late 14th century Beryslav was part of the Grand Duchy of Lithuania. Grand Duke Vytautas built a castle here. It served as a Lithuanian customs point, as the lower Dnieper formed the Lithuanian border. 

Later on it was known as the Turkish fortress of Kizikermen or Kazikermen (Gazikermen). Kazikermen and Islamkermen and Sahinkermen nearby were primary fortifications in the lower Dnieper area starting in the 15th century.  According to legend, chains were stretched across the Dnieper between the fortifications to control river traffic. Here was also one of the fords providing access across the Dnieper known as Tawan crossing. At the end of August of 1695, Kazikermen was sacked by the Zaporizhia Host Cossacks of Ivan Mazepa and the Sloboda Ukraine Cossacks of Boris Sheremetiev during the so called Azov-Dnieper campaigns.

By the 1700 Treaty of Constantinople, the Ottomans disbanded the fortifications. Later in the 19th century, ruins of the Kazikermen fortress were completely cleared away. After its 1784 re-establishment, the settlement was renamed Beryslav.

On 16 December, 1918, Hetman of Ukraine Pavlo Skoropadsky signed a telegram in Beryslav addressed to Kyiv where he officially resigned from his post. 

Beryslav was occupied by German forces on August 23, 1941. On September 22 about 400 Jews then living in Beryslav were murdered near the town by the members of Einsatzgruppe D. Another 35 Jews from Beryslav were shot in early October 1941.  Beryslav was liberated by the Red Army on March 11, 1944.

Since August 2016, the city has hosted the revived Ukrainian Premier League and UEFA Europa League football club, Tavriya Simferopol.

During the Russian invasion of Ukraine in 2022, Beryslav was one of many settlements occupied by the Russians, but was recaptured by the Ukrainian military during the southern counteroffensive on 11 November.

See also 

 Holy Presentation Church, located in the city
 List of cities in Ukraine

Gallery

References

External links
 Kniazkov, Yu. Kazikermen. Encyclopedia of History of Ukraine. 2007
 Vyrskyi, D. Beryslav. Encyclopedia of History of Ukraine. 2003
 The murder of the Jews of Beryslav during World War II, at Yad Vashem website.

Cities in Kherson Oblast
Khersonsky Uyezd
Cities of district significance in Ukraine
Populated places established in the Russian Empire
Holocaust locations in Ukraine
Populated places on the Dnieper in Ukraine
Populated places of Kakhovka Reservoir